The 3rd BRDC International Trophy meeting was held on 5 May 1951 at the Silverstone Circuit, England. The race was run to Formula One regulations, and was held over two heats of 15 laps each, followed by a final race of 35 scheduled laps. However, the race was stopped after just six laps due to torrential rain and flooding. British driver Reg Parnell, driving a Ferrari 375, was declared the winner.

Results

Final – 6 Laps

Heats – 15 Laps

References

BRDC International Trophy
BRDC International Trophy
BRDC International Trophy
BRDC International Trophy